Sedanolide is a tetrahydrophthalide compound with the molecular formula C12H18O2.
It is reported that sedanolide is one of flavor constituents of celery oil from fresh celery.

Isomers 
There are 4 stereo isomers.
 (3R,3aR)-sedanolide
 (3R,3aS)-sedanolide
 (3S,3aR)-sedanolide - Also called neocnidilide or trans-sedanolide.
 (3S,3aS)-sedanolide

Similar compounds 

 cnidilide
 3-butylhexahydrophthalide

External links 
 The Sedanolides, John C. Leffingwell, Ph.D., Chirality & Odour Perception

References

Phthalides
Flavors
Celery